Erica arborea, the tree heath or tree heather, is a species of flowering plant (angiosperms) in the heather family Ericaceae, native to the Mediterranean Basin and Ethiopia, Kenya and Tanzania in East Africa. It is also cultivated as an ornamental.

The wood, known as briar root (French: bruyère, Catalan: bruc, Portuguese: betouro, Spanish: brezo), is extremely hard and heat-resistant, and is used for making smoking pipes. Leaf fossils attributed to this species were described for the Mio-Pleistocene deposit of São Jorge in Madeira Island.

Description 
It bears dark green needle-like leaves and numerous small honey-scented bell-shaped white flowers. It is a calcifuge, preferring acid soil in an open sunny situation.

Distribution
There are disjunct populations in Africa including the Ethiopian Highlands, the mountains of Ruwenzori and the Cameroon Mountains. In Africa it is normally referred to as giant heather.  It is native to the maquis shrublands surrounding the Mediterranean Basin north to Bulgaria and west to Portugal and the Canary and Madeira Islands.  Naturalised populations occur in south-eastern Australia.

Cultivars
Several cultivars and hybrids have been developed for garden use, of which the following have gained the Royal Horticultural Society's Award of Garden Merit: 
E. arborea 'Estrella Gold' (gold-tipped leaves)
E. arborea var. alpina 
E. arborea var. alpina f. aureifolia 'Albert's Gold' (gold-leaved)
E. × veitchii 'Gold Tips' (E. arborea × E. lusitanica)

Other tall growing heaths, including the Portugal Heath (Erica lusitanica) and channel heath (Erica canaliculata) may also sometimes be called tree heath.

Uses

The wood, known as briar root, is extremely hard, dense and heat-resistant, and is primarily used for making smoking pipes, as it does not affect the aroma of tobacco. The football-sized tubers are harvested at the age of 30 to 60 years. They are cooked for several hours, then dried for several months before they are further processed. 

The wood is also used for making jewellery, fountain pens and knife handles.

See also
 Mediterranean forests, woodlands, and scrub

References

External links

 Adams, W.M., A.S. Goudie & A. R. Orme (eds.) (1996): The Physical Geography of Africa. Page 55. Oxford University Press.
 

arborea
Afromontane flora
Matorral shrubland
Flora of France
Flora of Bulgaria
Flora of Ethiopia
Flora of Italy
Flora of Portugal
Flora of Spain
Flora of the Canary Islands
Flora of Madeira
Flora naturalised in Australia
Pipe smoking
Garden plants of Europe
Plants described in 1753
Taxa named by Carl Linnaeus